The 2011–12 Super Division (50th edition), Algeria's top tier basketball club competition, ran from October 27, 2011 through May 29, 2012. Where he was crowned by the GS Pétroliers for the third time in a row and 15 in its history.

ABC Super Division Participants (2011–12 Season)

Regular Season (October 27, 2011 - May 29, 2012)

 Note: Small number and number in brackets indicate round number and leg, respectively Next scheduled games

Regular season standings
Updated as of 19 October 2017.

 1 loss by default (no point awarded)
 2 loss by default (no point awarded)
 Champion

Team champions

References

Algerian Basketball Championship seasons
League
Algeria